Alexey Ivanovich Kazannik (26 July 1941 – 2 June 2019) was a Russian lawyer and politician.

Biography 
Born in Horodnia Raion, Ukrainian SSR, he studied law at Irkutsk State University, graduating in 1967. In 1989, he gained notability for granting his seat in the Supreme Soviet of the Soviet Union to Boris Yeltsin. Between 1993 and 1994, Kazannik was Prosecutor General of Russia. Kazannik later served as Deputy Governor of Omsk Oblast from 1995 to 2003. Additionally, he taught law at Omsk State University.

Kazannik died following a long illness on 2 June 2019 in Omsk, at the age of 77.

References

1941 births
2019 deaths
20th-century Russian lawyers
21st-century Russian lawyers
20th-century Russian politicians
21st-century Russian politicians
General Prosecutors of Russia
People from Chernihiv Oblast
Politicians from Omsk
Academic staff of Omsk State University